The 2013–14 Toledo Rockets men's basketball team represented the University of Toledo during the 2013–14 NCAA Division I men's basketball season. The Rockets, led by fourth year head coach Tod Kowalczyk, played their home games at the Savage Arena as members of the West Division of the Mid-American Conference. After sitting out the postseason in 2012–13 due to low APR scores, the Rockets became eligible for the MAC and NCAA Tournaments in 2013–14. They finished the season 27–7, 14–4 in MAC play to finish in a share for the West Division championship and the #1 overall seed in the MAC tournament. They advanced to the MAC championship game where they lost to Western Michigan. As the MAC #1 seed who failed to win the conference tournament, the received an automatic bid to the National Invitation Tournament where they lost in the first round to Southern Miss.

Season

Preseason
The Rockets announced their complete season schedule on September 3, 2013. The Rockets' non-conference schedule was highlighted by a trip to Detroit for a 2K Sports Classic subregional. Trips to Boston College, Robert Morris, and Kansas also were scheduled. For the conference slate, the Rockets scheduled home-and-home series with Ball State, Central Michigan, Eastern Michigan, Northern Illinois, Western Michigan, Ohio, and Bowling Green, while hosting Buffalo and Kent State and visiting Akron and Miami.

Roster

Schedule and results
Source: 

|-
!colspan=9 style="background:#000080; color:#f9d819;"| Exhibition

|-
!colspan=9 style="background:#000080; color:#f9d819;"| Non-conference games

|-
!colspan=9 style="background:#000080; color:#f9d819;"| Conference games

|-
!colspan=9 style="background:#000080; color:#f9d819;"| MAC tournament

|-
!colspan=9 style="background:#000080; color:#f9d819;"| NIT

References

Toledo
Toledo Rockets men's basketball seasons
Toledo